Shaler may refer to:

Shaler (crater), lunar impact crater
Shaler Mountains, mountain range in Canada
Shaler Battery, American Civil War fort
Shaler Township, Pennsylvania
Shaler (surname)
Shaler cliffs
Shaler North Hills Library
Shaler Halimon (1945 – 2021), American basketball player